Jon Stratton is an Australian academic and scholar in the field of cultural studies. He has authored 11 sole books, edited five collections, and written over 80 journal articles. For over 25 years, he has been a media commentator in print, radio, and television.

Education and career 
Stratton studied European Literature, History of Ideas and Sociology as part of his first degree at Bradford University. He was a member of the Drama Society which functioned under the direction of the University Fellow in Theatre, Chris Parr. Stratton performed in many first-run productions of plays by early career playwrights, some of whom became important in British avant-garde theatre.  Among the plays in which Stratton performed were David Edgar's The End (1972), a history of the Campaign for Nuclear Disarmament, Howard Brenton's Scott of the Antarctic (1971), also known as Scott of the Antarctic on Ice, and Richard Crane's Crippen: A Music-Hall Melodrama (1971), which the cast took to the Edinburgh Fringe Festival in the same year.

Stratton has a PhD in sociology from the University of Essex and has worked in Australia since 1980, teaching at universities in Brisbane (Griffith University, Queensland University of Technology, University of Queensland), Armidale (University of New England), Darwin (Northern Territory University), and Perth, (Curtin University).

Stratton's work critically examines aspects of everyday life, and popular music, centered on issues of identity and cultural specificity. His published works include articles on soap operas, subculture, cyberspace, postmodernity, the body, and the role of race and multiculturalism in Australian culture. Stratton has published three books on issues associated with Jewishness and identity.

Stratton was Vice-President of the Australasian Cultural Studies Association between 2000 and 2004. He co-edited the Transnational Cultural Studies series for University of Illinois Press between 1997 and 2000. In 1998, he held a Rockefeller Fellowship at the International Forum for United States' Studies at the University of Iowa. Stratton has been the chief investigator for two Australian Research Council grants. Most recently, in 2013, on the history of popular music in Perth. Stratton is on the editorial boards of Continuum: Journal of Media and Cultural Studies, the European Journal of Cultural Studies, the International Journal of Cultural Studies, and Perfect Beat: The Pacific Journal of Research into Contemporary Music and Popular Culture amongst other journals.  Stratton is an editor of the e-journal Borderlands.

Stratton is actively publishing and is an adjunct professor in the School of Creative Industries at University of South Australia. He served as professor of Cultural Studies at Curtin University until his retirement in 2014.

Bibliography
Stratton has written the following:

 Bennett, Andy and Jon Stratton eds. (2010) Britpop and the English Music Tradition Ashgate 
 Stratton, Jon (2011) Uncertain Lives: Culture, Race and Neoliberalism in Australia Cambridge Scholars Publishing  
 Stratton, Jon (2014) When Music Migrates: Crossing British and European Racial Faultlines 1945–2010 Ashgate 
 Stratton, Jon and Nabeel Zuberi eds. (2014) Black Popular Music in Britain since 1945 Ashgate 

Stratton has also coedited the following journal issues:
Andy Bennett, Jon Stratton and Richard Peterson eds.  Australian Music Scenes, special issue of Continuum: Journal of Media & Cultural Studies, vol 22, no 5, 2008.
Suvendrini Perera, Jon Stratton eds. The Border, the Asylum Seeker and the State of Exception, special issue of Continuum: Journal of Media & Cultural Studies, vol 23, no 5, 2009.
Jon Stratton and Peter Beilharz eds. Way Out West: Mapping Western Australia, special issue of Thesis Eleven, vol 135, no 1, 2016.

References

2. University of South Australia

Australian non-fiction writers
Academic staff of Griffith University
Cultural academics
Living people
Rockefeller Fellows
Year of birth missing (living people)
Academic staff of Charles Darwin University
Academic staff of Curtin University